Air ACT, legally ACT Airlines (Turkish: ACT Havayollari) and formerly branded as myCargo Airlines, is a Turkish cargo airline based in Kurtköy, Istanbul. It operates international scheduled and charter air cargo services, as well as wet and dry lease services. Its main base is Sabiha Gökçen International Airport, Istanbul.

History
Established in 2004, the company changed ownership in March 2006 when Turkish aviation veteran Yavuz Cizmeci teamed up with HBK Investments to acquire the company. In February 2008, a 21% equity stake was acquired by Manara Investments Ltd. Manara is an investment vehicle sponsored by four leading Saudi business groups. New partners and existing shareholders expect ACT Airlines to become a leading regional and international player.

ACT received the prestigious SCATA Supply Chain and Transport Award for ‘The Air Cargo Operator of the Year’ in recognition of its exceptional customer service in 2007. The airlines also applied for IATA certification after completing the IATA Operational Safety Audit in 2007.

In 2011, China's HNA Group (partnered with Bravia Capital) bought 49% of the shares of ACT Airlines. 50.9% of the shares remain with Daglar Cizmeci and 0.1% with other Turkish holders. ACT Airlines rebranded as myCargo after this alliance took place.: In August 2017 HNA swapped its shares in MyCargo for another subsidiary in Turkey, leading to airline going back to full ownership with its admin and operating as ACT Airlines once again, with fleet gradually being repainted to the brand Air ACT.

Fleet

Current fleet

The ACT Airlines fleet includes the following aircraft (as of September 2019):

In June 2021, ACT Airlines resumed service with its previously damaged B747-400F, serial 26559.

Historic fleet
ACT Airlines formerly operated five Airbus A300 freighter aircraft with 1 hull loss in 2010. All those aircraft were retired in March 2013.

Incidents and accidents

On 1 March 2010, an Airbus A300 registration TC-ACB operating Flight 521 for SNAS/DHL, sustained substantial damage when the port undercarriage collapsed on landing at Bagram Airfield, Afghanistan.
On 16 January 2017 Turkish Airlines Flight 6491, a wet leased Boeing B747-412F TC-MCL operated by MyCargo (ACT Airlines previous operating name), crashed during a go-around from a very low altitude while attempting an approach to Manas Airport, Bishkek, Kyrgyzstan. The crash killed all four crew members and 35 people on the ground.
On 1 February 2020 Saudia Flight 919, a wet leased Boeing B747-412F TC-MCT operated by ACT Airlines, struck its tail onto the runway during departure from King Fahd International Airport, Dammam, Saudi Arabia. The crew stopped the climb initially at 7000 feet, later climbed to FL100 and subsequently decided to divert to King Abdulaziz International Airport, Jeddah, Saudi Arabia.

References

Citations

Bibliography

External links

Airlines of Turkey
Airlines established in 2004
Cargo airlines of Turkey
HNA Group
Turkish companies established in 2004